Hazel Adair may refer to:

Hazel Adair (novelist) (1900–1990), British novelist
Hazel Adair (screenwriter) (1920–2015), British actress and screenwriter